Brno Noppeisen was a bilingual workers newspaper issued in Brno in the 1870s. Brno Noppeisen was published jointly by German and Czech socialists in the city.

References

Bilingual newspapers
Defunct newspapers published in Czechoslovakia
Mass media in Brno
Defunct newspapers published in the Czech Republic
Publications with year of establishment missing
Socialist newspapers
German-language newspapers published in Czechoslovakia